The 1955–56 National Football League was the 25th staging of the National Football League (NFL), an annual Gaelic football tournament for the Gaelic Athletic Association county teams of Ireland.

Cork beat Meath in the final.

Results

Finals

References

National Football League
National Football League
National Football League (Ireland) seasons